Neil Richard Joseph Barrett (born 27 July 1992 in Dublin) is an Irish rugby union player. He is a back-row forward who can play either blind side flanker or at number 8, and has occasionally played at centre. He plays club rugby for Leinster in the Pro14 and Heineken Cup. Barrett, still not 20 years old, is seen as a great prospect for the future, and is a current member of the Irish national u-20 team, having also played for his country at u-18 (schools) and u-19 level. He is renowned for his ball carrying ability and strength, as well as crowd-pleasing "big hits", or impact tackles. He also represents a solid line-out option and is near the complete back-rower due to combativeness at the breakdown. He is yet to establish himself as a starter for the senior Leinster team, but has made five appearances, as well as playing regularly for both the "A" and u-20 sides. While attending Blackrock College he helped the school to win both the Senior and Junior cup. He was on the same cup-winning teams as fellow Leinster Rugby academy member and Ireland u-20 teammate Simon Hillary.

References

http://www.leinsterrugby.ie/profiles/index.php
https://web.archive.org/web/20121015082010/http://www.irb.com/jwc/teams/team=3227/index.html
http://www.herald.ie/sport/rugby/u20-boss-ruddock-plays-the-blues-3006046.html

Living people
Irish rugby union players
1992 births
People educated at Blackrock College
Rugby union flankers
Rugby union players from Dublin (city)
Leinster Rugby players